Robert Alexander "Spider" Johnson (May 16, 1907, Goin, Tennessee – March 7, 1966) was an American football tackle who played one season with the Portsmouth Spartans of the National Football League. He played college football for the Chattanooga Mocs of the University of Chattanooga.

References

External links
Just Sports Stats

1907 births
1966 deaths
American football tackles
Chattanooga Mocs football players
Portsmouth Spartans players
Place of death missing
People from Claiborne County, Tennessee